The 74th Regiment Illinois Volunteer Infantry was an infantry regiment that served in the Union Army during the American Civil War.

Service
74th Regiment Illinois  was organized at Rockford, Illinois and mustered into Federal service on September 4, 1862.

The regiment was discharged from service on June 10, 1865.

Total strength and casualties
The regiment suffered 5 officers and 78 enlisted men who were killed in action or mortally wounded and 3 officers and 116 enlisted men who died of disease, for a total of 202 fatalities.

Commanders
Colonel Jason Marsh - Resigned August 24, 1864.
Lieutenant Colonel Thomas J. Bryan - Mustered out with the regiment.

See also
List of Illinois Civil War Units
Illinois in the American Civil War

Notes

References
The Civil War Archive

Units and formations of the Union Army from Illinois
1862 establishments in Illinois
Military units and formations established in 1862
Military units and formations disestablished in 1865